Misterton was a rural district in Nottinghamshire, England from 1894 to 1935.

It was formed under the Local Government Act 1894, from the part of the Gainsborough rural sanitary district which was in Nottinghamshire (the rest forming Gainsborough Rural District in Lincolnshire.)

It included the following parishes
Beckingham
Bole
Misterton
Saundby
Walkeringham
West Burton
West Stockwith

The district was abolished in 1935 under a County Review Order, and was added to the existing East Retford Rural District.  Since 1974 it has been in the Bassetlaw district.

References
https://web.archive.org/web/20071001011301/http://www.visionofbritain.org.uk/relationships.jsp?u_id=10186638

Local government in Nottinghamshire
Districts of England created by the Local Government Act 1894
Rural districts of Nottinghamshire
Bassetlaw District